Gharanai Khwakhuzhi is a Career Diplomat and Foreign Service Officer of the Ministry of Foreign Affairs of the Islamic Republic of Afghanistan, who served as the Director General for Regional Cooperation of the Ministry of Foreign Affairs dealing with the Heart of Asia - Istanbul Process, Afghanistan's representation in regional organizations and the Afghan government's initiative of Strengthening Regional Consensus for Peace; until the fall of the Afghan Republic in August 2021.

Along with his national languages (Pashto and Dari) he is fluent in English.

Early life and education 

Khwakhuzhi was born on 28 September 1984 in Shar-e-Now – Kabul, originally from Kandahar province. He is the eldest son of Gen.Gharzai Khwakhuzhi, a writer, political analyst and Afghan Army General, and grandson of Mohammad Ibraheem Khwakhuzhi, a writer, poet, teacher and politician. Khwakhuzhi started his primary schooling at Shirpur Primary School in Shar-e-Now, Kabul.

Due to the civil war in 1992 he had to take refuge in Pakistan and continued his schooling at FG School till 5th standard, due to the expanding distance from Afghan Culture and Language he started attending Abu Ali Sina Balkhi Secondary School (an Afghan School in Islamabad) and got his Baccalaureate from Aryana High School in 2004.

In 2009 he graduated from Preston University with a First Class Honors Degree (BSc) in Information Technology.

In January 2013 he got his Post-Graduate Degree in Political Science and Diplomacy from the Institute of Diplomacy, Ministry of Foreign Affairs Islamic Republic of Afghanistan, becoming a Career Diplomat.

In September 2018 he graduated from Vrije Universiteit Brussel with a Masters of Science Degree (Merit) in European Social and Political Integration. His dissertation topic was "EU Development Cooperation: Case Study of Afghanistan". 

He also holds:
Certificate in Peace Building and Conflict Resolution from United States Institute of Peace (USIP)
Certificate in E-Governance, International Relations and Negotiations from Estonian School of Diplomacy (Eesti Diplomaatide Kool)
Certificate in Diplomacy from Federal Foreign Office of Germany (Auswärtiges Amt)
Certificate in Strategic Policy Planning from Netherlands Institute of International Relations Clingendael
Certificate in Diplomatic Studies, Post Conflict Crisis Management, Negotiations and Political Decision Making from Center for Political and Diplomatic Studies (UK)
Certificate in Diplomacy, Counter Terrorism Policies and International Relations from Ministry of Foreign Affairs and Trade of Mongolia
Certificate in Introduction to the Ministry of Foreign Affairs of Afghanistan
Certificates in Fundamental Computer Concepts and Basic Programming Languages from different training centers
Diploma in English Language from Canadian Center for Literature and Language Studies

Career 

In October 2011 he started serving as a Foreign Service Officer in the Ministry of Foreign Affairs Islamic Republic of Afghanistan, soon he was promoted as the Deputy Director of Foreign Communications at the Directorate General of Communications and Archive.

In November 2012 having served for more than a year he was promoted as the Director of Media Monitoring Department at the Office of Spokesman and Directorate General of Communications, where he served till September 2015. He also served as the Acting Deputy Director-General of Media Relations at the Office of Spokesman and Directorate General of Communications for a year and nine months from May 2013 till October 2014 and July 2015 till September 2015.

In September 2015, he was assigned to his first foreign posting as the 1st Secretary of the Embassy of Afghanistan in the Kingdom of Belgium, the Grand Duchy of Luxembourg (NR) and the Mission of Afghanistan to the European Union and the North Atlantic Treaty Organization. He worked at this post till September 2018 while dealing with the Political and EU Affairs of the Embassy and Mission.

At his capacity as the Deputy Director General and later Director General for Regional Cooperation of the Ministry of Foreign Affairs of the Islamic Republic of Afghanistan, he manages political consultations and confidence building measures with the countries of the region. He is also a member of the Ministry's team dealing with the Afghan Peace Process' regional dimension, especially attaining regional consensus and support of the Afghan-led, Afghan-owned Peace Process.

Political and social activities 

Gharanai Khwakhuzhi started his working life with an Afghan-Japanese NGO, Karez Health and Education Services in 2002 where he was responsible for coordinating and managing activities of the NGO in Pakistan, with the aim of the NGO was to provide Health and Education services to Afghans in Pakistan and Afghanistan.

Later in 2008 he had to settle down in Dubai, UAE and started his own company by the name of GASP LLC which was involved in general trading. 

He has campaigned as a member of Public Relations section at the Office of People's Support of Hamid Karzai for Presidential Elections of 2009 as well as head of Public Relations and Media section at the Office of Hamid Karzai's Presidential Campaign of 2004 in Islamabad Pakistan.

Apart from political life, he is also a lifelong social activist working for equality of humankind in all fields of life. He has served as the head of Public Relations and Media section of Khwakhuzhi Literary and Cultural Association – an association that promotes Literacy and Afghan Culture around the country – since the establishment of the association in 2004.

He has also actively participated in different voluntary associations in Pakistan (Red Cross Blood Donors' Club), UAE (Dubai Volunteers), Belgium (Croix-Rouge Blood Donor's Club) and Afghanistan (Youth in Action).

In his spare time he blogs on political affairs and writes articles for newspapers and online websites and he lists photography, reading, writing, documentaries, football and cricket as his hobbies.

External links 
 Gharanai Khwakhuzhi's Blog
 Official Webpage of the Heart of Asia - Istanbul Process 
 Top List 
 Alumni Portraits

Afghan diplomats
Baloch people
People from Kandahar
Afghan expatriates in Pakistan
Living people
1984 births